"Law of the Land" is a soul song written by Norman Whitfield for the Motown label. A socially conscious funk track with elements of early disco music, it details the rules of human society that people have to accept and live by.

Details
The song was recorded by both of Whitfield's groups, The Temptations and The Undisputed Truth, in 1973 (January and April, respectively), and both versions were given single release. The Temptations' version was released as a UK-only single by Tamla Motown, and just missed out on the UK Top 40, reaching number 41. That version was included on volume eight of the Motown Chartbusters compilation album series. The Undisputed Truth released their version of song that same year, and it became a minor hit in America, making number 40 on the R&B Charts.

Personnel

The Temptations version
 Lead vocals by Dennis Edwards, Richard Street, Damon Harris
 Background vocals by Dennis Edwards, Richard Street, Damon Harris, Melvin Franklin and Otis Williams

The Undisputed Truth version
 Lead and background vocals by Joe Harris, Billie Rae Calvin and Brenda Joyce Evans

Covers
The Undisputed Truth, having been disbanded for the entirety of the 1980s, reformed with Brainstorm vocalist Belita Woods to record a new version of the song for Motown lover Ian Levine and his Motorcity Records label. The rerecorded song (with some new lyrics added) was released as an 8-minute-long 12-inch single in 1991.

References

1971 singles
The Temptations songs
Songs written by Norman Whitfield
Psychedelic soul songs
Song recordings produced by Norman Whitfield
1971 songs
Gordy Records singles
Motown singles